Dobro došli prijatelji (Welcome, Friends) is the sixth studio album by Bosnian folk singer Hanka Paldum. It was released 24 January 1983 through the record label Jugodisk.

Track listing
Dobro došli, prijatelji
Neću oproštaj da ti dam
Htio si sam
Žena kao ja
Usne moje da te ljube
Kako opet voljeti
Ne ljubi me noćas, mili
Ko je krivac, ti il’ ja

References

1983 albums
Hanka Paldum albums
Jugodisk albums